Free Presbyterian Church may refer to:
 Free Presbyterian Church (Australia) 
 Free Presbyterian Church of Victoria, formerly Free Presbyterian Church of Australia Felix
 Presbyterian Church of Eastern Australia or the Free Presbyterian Church
 Free Presbyterian Church of Scotland, formed in 1893
 Free Presbyterian Church of Ulster, founded in 1951
 Free Presbyterian Church of North America, became self-sufficient in 2005